Oscar Easley Block, also known as Historic City Hall, is a prominent building that was one of the early founding buildings in San Clemente, California,
originally built to house offices and a bank.  The building was added to the National Register of Historic Places listings in Orange County, California in 1983.

History

Construction
Two years after the initial grading was completed by Oscar Easley's street grading crew, Easley acquired the property across the street from Ole Hansen's real estate offices which were selling lots in the newly created city of San Clemente. Easley was also responsible for laying the foundation for Ole Hansen's beachfront home Casa Romantica. 
In March 1929, a building permit was pulled to construct a two-story office building. The first floor of the office building would eventually be occupied by Bank of America, while the second floor would become offices for the Chamber of Commerce, and Headquarters of the Ole Hanson Organization. 
The office building was designed by Virgil Westbrook who was also the designer of the San Clemente Beach Club. The building was built by Leroy M Strang. Virgel and Leroy both were elected in 1928 to the first five-member City Council of San Clemente. Leroy also served as the Mayor.

Ownership
In 1936 the building became property of the Bank Of America due to a foreclosure action. The building then was acquired by a new owner who conducted a retail music business called the "House Of Music" on the property.

References

External links
Nomination Form - National Register of Historic Places

Buildings and structures in San Clemente, California
National Register of Historic Places in Orange County, California
Spanish Colonial Revival architecture in California